Christopher Stone (born Thomas Edward Bourassa; October 4, 1940 – October 20, 1995) was an American actor.

Early life
Stone was born Thomas Edward Bourassa in Manchester, New Hampshire.

Career
He appeared in films and on television from the early 1970s until his death in 1995. Stone and his wife, Dee Wallace, both appeared together in a number of films including the classic horror films The Howling (1981) and Cujo (1983). They shared top billing in the family series The New Lassie (1989), in which he sometimes served as director.

In the 1970-71 season, Stone co-starred with Broderick Crawford, Mike Farrell, and Skip Homeier in the CBS medical drama The Interns, based on a film of the same title. Stone played Dr. Jim "Pooch" Hardin; Crawford was cast as the crusty hospital administrator; Farrell was Dr. Sam Marsh, and Homeier portrayed Dr. Hugh Jacoby. The Interns aired for one season of 24 episodes. In 1983, he guest-starred in The Dukes Of Hazzard sixth-season episode, Brotherly Love, as crooked gambler Tex Tompkins.

In 1975, Stone guest-starred in an episode of the CBS family drama Three for the Road. He co-starred as Cass Garrett on the CBS series Spencer's Pilots, which aired only six episodes from September 17 to November 19, 1976. Gene Evans starred as Spencer Parish, the owner of Spencer Aviation, a charter pilot service. He guest-starred in the Galactica 1980 episode "Galactica Discovers Earth", and in the Buck Rogers in the 25th Century episode "Space Vampire".
 He played Col. Marty Vidor, alias "Bo-Dai Thung", in the 1984 Airwolf episode "And They Are Us".

Other television credits include guest roles in series such as Fantasy Island, as Riptide (second-season episode "Catch of the Day" (1984)) and The A-Team (third-season episode "Incident at Crystal Lake" (1985)). He also was a guest star on The Bionic Woman in a first-season episode: "Fly Jaime"; and then became Jaime Sommers' love interest in four episodes: "The Pyramid", "The Antidote", "Sanctuary Earth" and "On the Run"; in the third season.

Stone and his wife Dee Wallace also appeared together in Cujo  (1983), Legend of the White Horse (1987), and in Runaway Daughters (1994), a made-for-TV movie that was a remake of the 1950s B movie.

Personal life
Stone dated actress Susan Tolsky for five years after meeting in the late 1960s. Stone married actress Dee Wallace in 1980; they worked on several projects together before their daughter Gabrielle Stone was born in 1988.

Death
Stone died of a heart attack on October 20, 1995.

Filmography

Film

Television

References

External links

 
 
 

1942 births
1995 deaths
American male film actors
American male television actors
Male actors from Los Angeles
Actors from Manchester, New Hampshire
20th-century American male actors